RTBF Sat was a Belgian international television channel, available throughout Europe by digital satellite.

History 
RTBF Sat was launched by RTBF on 26 November 2001. From 26 November 2008, the channel changed satellite of transmission from Astra to Hot Bird.

On 15 February 2010, RTBF Sat closed down due to budgetary constraints. However, a possible RTBF Sat relaunch is mentioned in RTBF's 2013-2017 contract.

References

External links
www.rtbfsat.be
Article about the passage of RTBF Sat from Astra to Hot Bird (in Italian)

Defunct television channels in Belgium
French-language television stations in Belgium
International broadcasters
Television channels and stations established in 2001
Television channels and stations disestablished in 2010
2001 establishments in Belgium
2010 disestablishments in Belgium